Vladimir Anić (21 November 1930 – 30 November 2000) was a Croatian linguist and lexicographer. He is the author of Rječnik hrvatskoga jezika (1991), the first modern single-volume dictionary of Croatian.

Anić was born in Užice, Serbia. He received a B.A. degree in Yugoslav languages and literature and Russian language and literature at the Faculty of Philosophy in Zagreb in 1956. In 1963 he obtained a Ph.D. with the thesis Language of Ante Kovačić. He taught at the Faculty of Philosophy in Zadar from 1960 to 1974, when he moved to the Faculty of Philosophy in Zagreb, becoming a full professor and head of the Department of Croatian literary language in 1976.

Anić published more than two hundred papers, studies, reviews and assays in subject areas of syntax, phonology, accentuation, morphology, lexicography, lexicology, terminology and stylistics. He taught at universities in Germany, Sweden and Slovenia.

Vladimir Anić's dictionary of Croatian started in 1972 and was published in December 1991, 90 years after the last comparable dictionary by Ivan Broz and Franjo Iveković. Two expanded and revised editions followed in 1994 and 1998, while the fourth edition, complete with a CD-ROM version, was published posthumously in 2003.

As a linguist, Vladimir Anić was a staunch descriptivist; he saw his dictionary as "not a book of best words, but a book of all words", and stressed the need for language creativity and freedom as a counterweight against purism.

He died in Zagreb.

References

External links

Hrvatski jezični portal – online Croatian dictionary based on Anić's work

1930 births
2000 deaths
Linguists from Croatia
Croatian lexicographers
Faculty of Humanities and Social Sciences, University of Zagreb alumni
Academic staff of the University of Zagreb
20th-century linguists
Burials at Mirogoj Cemetery
20th-century lexicographers